Juodžiai (formerly) is a village in Kėdainiai district municipality, in Kaunas County, in central Lithuania. According to the 2011 census, the village had a population of 62 people. The Lendrynė Ornitological Sanctuary is located nearby Juodžiai.

History
There was Juodžiai village and folwark (a property of Benedykt Tyszkiewicz) at the end of the 19th century. There was the Crucified Jesus chapel (built in 1780).

Demography

Images

References

Villages in Kaunas County
Kėdainiai District Municipality